Henrique may refer to:

Henry, Count of Portugal (1066–1112)
Henry I, King of Portugal (1512–1580)
Henry the Navigator (1394–1460), a royal prince and important figure in the early days of the Portuguese Empire
Infante Henry, 4th Duke of Coimbra (born 1949)

People
Carlos Henrique (disambiguation), several people
Fernando Henrique (disambiguation), several people

Arts and entertainment
Henrique Campos (1909–1983), Portuguese film director
Henrique de Curitiba (1934–2008), Brazilian composer
Henrique Lopes de Mendonça (1856–1931), Portuguese poet, playwright and naval officer
Henrique Pousão (1859–1884), Portuguese painter

Politics and military
Henrique Capriles (born 1972), Venezuelan politician
Henrique Galvão (1895–1970), Portuguese military officer, politician and writer
Henrique Meirelles (born 1945), Brazilian former Minister of the Economy, president of the Banco Central do Brasil
Henrique Mitchell de Paiva Cabral Couceiro (1861–1944), Portuguese military
Henrique Rosa (1946–2013), interim president of Guinea-Bissau

Science, medicine, and technology
Emílio Henrique Baumgart (1889–1943), Brazilian engineer
Henrique da Rocha Lima (1879–1956), Brazilian physician, pathologist and infectologist
Henrique Walter Pinotti (1929–2010), Brazilian physician and gastric surgeon
Sérgio Henrique Ferreira (1934–2016), Brazilian physician and pharmacologist

Sports

Football
Henrique (footballer, born 1966), Henrique Arlindo Etges, Brazilian football defender
Henrique (footballer, born 1976), Carlos Henrique Raimundo Rodrigues, Brazilian football forward
Henrique (footballer, born 1977), Leonardo Henrique Peixoto dos Santos, Brazilian football centre-back
Henrique (footballer, born 1980), José Henrique Souto Esteves, Portuguese football forward
Henrique (footballer, born 1982), Henrique Da Silva Gomes, Brazilian football defender
Henrique (footballer, born 1983), Carlos Henrique dos Santos Souza, Brazilian football defender
Henrique (footballer, born 9 May 1985), Henrique Andrade Silva, Brazilian football winger
Henrique (footballer, born 16 May 1985), Henrique Pacheco de Lima, Brazilian football defensive midfielder
Henrique (footballer, born May 1986), Henrique Loureiro dos Santos, Brazilian football right-back
Henrique (footballer, born October 1986), Henrique Adriano Buss, Brazilian football centre-back
Henrique (footballer, born January 1987), Henrique de Jesus Bernardo, Brazilian football forward
Henrique (footballer, born May 1987), Henrique Neris de Brito, Brazilian football striker
Henrique (footballer, born 1989), Carlos Henrique Barbosa Augusto, Brazilian footballer
Henrique (footballer, born 1993), Henrique Roberto Rafael, Brazilian football winger
Henrique (footballer, born 1994), Henrique Silva Milagres, Brazilian football left-back
Henrique (footballer, born 1995), Henrique Gelain Custodio, Brazilian football left-back
Henrique Frade (1934–2004), Brazilian football striker
José Henrique (born 1983), Portuguese goalkeeper

Other sports
Adam Henrique (born 1990), Canadian ice hockey forward
Henrique Guimarães (born 1972), Brazilian judoka

Other people
Prince Pedro Henrique of Orléans-Braganza (1909–1981), titular emperor of Brazil in 1921
Henrique Mecking (born 1952), Brazilian chess master

Other uses
Estádio D. Afonso Henriques, football stadium in Guimarães, Portugal
Henrique, São Tomé and Príncipe, village on the island of São Tomé
Order of Infante D. Henrique, Portuguese honorific order

See also
Henriques (disambiguation)

Portuguese masculine given names